The white-browed nuthatch (Sitta victoriae), also known as the Victoria nuthatch, is a species of bird in the family Sittidae. It is a small nuthatch, measuring  in length and without sexual dimorphism. Like many other nuthatches, the  are gray-blue, contrasting with white underparts on the throat, cheeks, and breast and orange on the flanks, belly, and lower abdomen. Its white supercilium makes it easy to distinguish it from the white-tailed nuthatch (S. himalayensis), which is a close species in the systematic and geographical sense. Little is known about its ecology, but it feeds on small insects found among bark and lichens, and breeding occurs around April.

The white-browed nuthatch is endemic to Nat Ma Taung, also known as Mount Victoria, in the southern Chin Hills of Myanmar. It inhabits old oak groves at high elevations, generally above . The numbers of the species are poorly known but are estimated at a few thousand individuals. They are threatened by habitat destruction by fire and human pressure. For these reasons, the International Union for the Conservation of Nature considers the bird to be an "endangered species."

Taxonomy 
The white-browed nuthatch was described in 1904 under its current binomial name, S. victoriae, by the British ornithologist and Lieutenant-Colonel George Rippon, and the holotype is deposited in the British Museum. British ornithologist Lieutenant H. Wood, who visited Nat Ma Taung, also known as Mount Victoria; thus, the species was called Sitta victoriae, visited nearby during the winter of 1901–1921, and was the first to explore the Chin hills ornithologically. Rippon then spent several months on Nat Ma Taung in 1904, collecting a large number of specimens in response to Wood's initial findings. It is most likely phylogenetically related to the white-tailed nuthatch (S. himalayensis), prompting Richard Meinertzhagen (in 1927), Ernst Mayr (in 1941), and Charles Vaurie (in 1957) to treat S. victoriae as a subspecies of S. himalayensis. However, Vaurie pointed out that there was no evidence of intergradation between the nuthatch from Nat Ma Taung and the nuthatch from the Mizo Hills in the Himalayas, 180 kilometers northeast of Nat Ma Taung. In 1957, British ornithologist Simon Harrap suggested that the small size, solid , and marked white supercilium may indicate close relationships with the Yunnan nuthatch (Sitta yunnanensis). German ornithologist Hans Edmund Wolters proposed the division of the genus Sitta into subgenera in 1975-1982. The white-browed nuthatch is placed in Sitta (Mesositta). According to the International Ornithological Congress and Alan P. Peterson, no subspecies are distinguished.

Päckert and colleagues (2020) studied the complete circum-Tibetan group of clades, which were sister to S. himalayensis and S. victoriae. Surprisingly, a deep split between three specimens of S. himalayaensis equaled interspecific divergences among species of clade. Within the group europaea, the white-tailed nuthatch and white-browed nuthatch are not included in the study, but appear to be basal.

Description 

The  of the white-browed nuthatch are bluish-gray, dull. Underparts are white from the throat and lower chest, but the belly is orange, with the underside and undertail light red and the flanks darker. The white-browed nuthatch has a white forehead, eyebrows, and lore, and a black line at the back of the eye, thickening backwards on the nape. The cheeks are as white as the throat but the back of the cheek is orange, with a white patch on the parotic coverts. No sexual dimorphism was found, and the juveniles could be distinguished by the lighter orange-red flanks. The bill is black at the tip and slate gray otherwise; the culmen and lower mandible are iris red-brown or dark brown, paler. The thighs are gray, and the legs are dull, yellowish-brown, or olive-brown.

The white-browed nuthatch can be confused with the white-tailed nuthatch, which can inhabit the same areas but which is rare where white-browed nuthatch lives. Adults in their fresh plumage have a whitish-narrow supercilium (to the back of the ear-coverts). The central tail feathers of white-browed nuthatch are light gray at the tip and have white over most of their base, which is distinctive from the white-tailed nuthatch in which the white is relatively sparse. It has a narrow black  that becomes much wider on the upper mantle. The white-browed nuthatch can also be recognized by its white eyebrows and forehead and the strong contrast between the white of the breast and the dark red flanks. Finally, the beak is shorter and thinner.

Ecology and behavior

Vocalizations

The call is produced at irregular intervals, and consists of a simple pit or plit. The white-browed nuthatch also emits an insistent pii, pii, pii... with 2.5 to 3.5 notes per second, produced more or less regularly. Harrap reports a possible song, consisting of 9 to 12 units at 9 notes per second and consisting of a whi-whi-whi... The classical song is a slow and soft trill composed of tuwi couplets emitted at the rate of 4 couplets per second, and produced in a stanza of 1.5 seconds rising in intensity tuwi-tuwi-tuwi-tuwi-tuwi-tuwit.

Food 
The nuthatch is usually seen alone or in pairs. It feeds on small insects which it usually finds in the epiphytes growing on the oaks, or in hollows in the bark. It generally explores the outer branches, but can also prospect on the branches more inside the tree or on the trunk. The plant species prospected are Quercus semecarpifolia half the time, but Rhododendron arboreum is also exploited, as well as, to a lesser extent, Lyonia ovalifolia, Lithocarpus dealbatus, Pinus kesiya, and Alnus nepalensis.

Breeding 

Distribution and habitat 

The white-browed nuthatch is endemic to western Myanmar.

The white-browed nuthatch avoids the pure pine forests of Pinus kesiya and is found instead in lichen-covered old oak forests of the alpine level. Thus, it was observed at an altitude of over  in 1940 and over  in the spring of 1995. However, during the description of the species in 1904, Rippon reported that he collected six birds between  altitude from March 22 to April 30; there could therefore be a seasonal altitudinal dispersion, with the birds leaving the higher altitudes during winter.

The white-browed nuthatch habitat consists mainly of Quercus semecarpifolia oaks, covered with epiphytic plants, lichens, mosses, orchids, and ferns.

Status and threats 
The white-browed nuthatch is one of four endemic bird species in Myanmar, the others being the Hooded treepie (Crypsirina cucullata), Burmese bush lark (Mirafra microptera) and White-throated babbler (Turdoides gularis). The counts of the species mentioned in the literature are very patchy: 14 birds were observed in 1995, then five over two weeks in April 2000, and 45 during four months of fieldwork in 2001-2003. In 2007, surveys in the Chin Hills did not find any observations of this nuthatch, suggesting that the species is highly endemic to the Nat Ma Taung region. These observations, combined with density and distribution data, indicate a population of 2,500 to 10,000 mature individuals, for a total of 3,500 to 15,000 individuals.

The population, estimated at a few thousand individuals, is declining. The species is legally protected by a 1994 Myanmarese law (Protection of Wildlife and Conservation of Natural Areas Law), but no protective measures are implemented, including discouraging the destruction of its habitat.

References

white-browed nuthatch
Endemic birds of Myanmar
white-browed nuthatch
Taxonomy articles created by Polbot